Naoe may refer to:

People 
Kay Naoe, one of the two founding members of Oceanlane
Naoe clan
Naoe Kanetsugu, a Japanese samurai of the 16th-17th centuries
Naoe Kagetsuna, an officer under the Uesugi clan
Naoe Kinoshita, a Japanese Christian socialist
Daisuke Naoe, a Japanese baseball player

Fictional characters 

Naoe Bungo, a character in the Japanese film G.I. Samurai
Naoe Kanno, a character from the anime/manga Strike Witches
Nobutsuna Naoe, a character from the anime/ova/light novel series Mirage of Blaze
Riki Naoe, the main protagonist from Little Busters! and Kud Wafter
Shigen Naoe, a character from the video game The Last Blade

Places 
Naoe Station, a train station

Japanese-language surnames
Japanese masculine given names